Svetlana Velmar-Janković (1 February 1933 – 9 April 2014) was a Serbian novelist, essayist, chronicler of Belgrade, and first female laureate of the Isidora Sekulić Award. She was considered to be one of the most important Serbian female authors of her time. In 2001, the French President Jacques Chirac honored her with the Chevalier medal of Legion of Honor because she always took care to preserve the humanist values which unite her and her country with the rest of Europe.

Life and work
Svetlana Velmar-Janković was born in Belgrade, in the city which should remain the center of life for her whole life until death. She grew up in city quarter Dorćol and was one of two daughters of Vladimir Velmar-Janković, appointed deputy minister of education of the Government of National Salvation in the German Territory of the Military Commander in Serbia, who escaped from Yugoslavia in September 1944. He left his wife and children behind. They had to accept serious social consequences because of that in communist Yugoslavia, and that was not easy to endure for the remained family members. At the beginning of the 3rd millennium, late efforts of his daughters to get him officially rehabilitated, ran into opposition. A brief statement by his famous daughter gives an idea of the long-term suffering of the family, and a question asked at the beginning of this millennium by a contemporary witness and representative of the post-war state, who was nobody else than Tito's official German language interpreter during state visits and receptions, brings up this issue to the point.

After completion of her secondary school education, she graduated with maturity diploma at IV gymnasium for girls in 1951, she began studying French language and literature at the Philological Faculty of Belgrade's University, and completed with diploma in 1963. In 1953, still while her education at university, she became journalist and wrote contributions to the youth magazines Dečje štampe and Pioniri. From 1959 to 1975, she was editor of the literary journal Književnost of Prosveta publishing house, and in 1971 she became member of the editorial board of this company, where she worked until 1989. In the meantime, she edited Prosveta's publication series Baština (Heritage) which consists of prose and essays of numerous Serbian authors.

She was elected corresponding member of the Serbian Academy of Sciences and Arts since 2006, and became a full member three years later. From 2007 to 2013, she was chairwoman of the board of directors of the National Library of Serbia.

Svetlana Velmar-Janković was married twice, her first marriage to journalist Miodrag Protić ended with his death in 1974, after twenty one years of wedlock, and her son Đorđe (born in 1966) comes from this relationship, he emigrated to the United States of America. She is interred in an honorary grave of the Belgrade New Cemetery. Her second husband was Žarko Rošulj (born in 1940), who worked at Nolit publishing as a graphic editor from 1978 to 1996 and died in 2018.

In its obituary, the newspaper Politika cites the deceased lady once again who will never be passed away in collective memory and lives on in her books about places, people and generations.

Her complete work is already including one or several editions in Bulgarian, German, English, French, Hungarian, Italian, Korean, Macedonian and Spanish translation, most of all published in French.
Internationally best known book from her complete work is the novel Lagum, which has also been published in Bulgarian, English (two editions in 1996 and 2002), French, German, Italian and Spanish translation. Lagum, a term of Turkish origin, refers to a dark dungeon-like underground passage, in which no light falls, as are numerous under the Kalemegdan fortress, and  scene of the plot is the city of Belgrade, written from the perspective of the wife of a professor of Belgrade University. Protagonist Milica Pavlović, first-person narrator, tells life events from her time period between 1928 and 1984. When her husband, the well-respected Dušan Pavlović, tried to save as many people as possible from the Ustashe extermination camps in the Independent State of Croatia during the war and therefore co-operated with Serbian Quisling government, the couple became increasingly estranged. Above that, Milica hides a wounded partisan in the servant room of her apartment without her husband's knowledge and children. The takeover of power by the communist resistance fighters become the fate of the family: Dušan is executed as a collaborator, the apartment is ransacked by neighbors who hastily turned into zealous and cruel henchmen of the new regime. Milica is reviled as a traitor by people whom she and her husband had saved years ago. So also from that partisan who recovered hidden in family's flat. It is a sensitive but relentless portrait of society, a profound analysis of human contradictions, character weaknesses and political opportunism.

Celia Hawkesworth, English translator of the novel Lagum, describes this work as follows:

For the past three decades of her life, Svetlana Velmar-Janković was not only a recognized Grande Dame of Serbian literature, but also a loud voice of conscience who courageously and unequivocally advocated democracy and human rights, based on humanism and European values of the Western world. Many possible examples could illustrate this, but only two are briefly presented here: an excerpt from her speech during the 1991 protests including the beginning of the Yugoslav wars and her statement about the Serbian declaration on Srebrenica massacre. She was also a member of the Truth and Reconciliation Commission (Komisija za istinu i pomirenje).

Bibliography
Novels
Ožiljak (Scar), 1956
Lagum (Dungeon), 1990
Bezdno (Bottomless), 1995
Nigdina (Nowhere), 2000
Vostanije (Uprising), 2004
Essays
Savremenici  (Contemporaries), 1967
Ukletnici (Cursed Ones), 1993
Izabranici (Chosen Ones), 2005
Srodnici  (Kinfolk), 2013
Memoirs
Prozraci (Ventilation), 2003 and 2015 (second volume, posthumous)
Short Stories, Narrations
Dorćol, 1981
Vračar, 1994
Glasovi (Voices), 1997
Knjiga za Marka (Book for Marko), children's literature, 1998
Očarane naočare: priče o Beogradu (Spellbound Spectacles: Stories About Belgrade), 2006
Sedam mojih drugara (Seven of my Friends), 2007
Zapisi sa dunavskog peska (Danube Sand Records), 2016 (posthumous) 
Monograph
Kapija Balkana: brzi vodič kroz prošlost Beograda (Gate of the Balkans: Quick Guide Through Belgrade's History), 2011
Theatre Plays
Žezlo (Sceptre, contains Stefan Dečanski and Knez Mihailo), 2011
Knez Mihailo, Premiere at Yugoslav Drama Theatre, 1996
Lagum, dramatized by Gordana Gocić, Premiere at Atelje 212, 1995
English editions
Dungeon (Lagum), translated by Celia Hawkesworth, Dereta and UCL, Belgrade and London 1996, .

Honors
Isidora Sekulić Award 1967 for Savreminici
Andrić Award 1981 for Dorćol 
Meša Selimović Award 1990 for Lagum
Award for the most read book of the National Library of Serbia 1991: Lagum
Borisav Stanković Award 1994 for Vračar 
Đorđe Jovanović Award 1994 for Vračar 
NIN Award 1995 for Bezdno
Neven Award 1998 for Knjiga za Marka
Politikin Zabavnik Award 1998 for Knjiga za Marka
Mišićev dukat 2001 for life achievement
Legion of Honor (Chevalier medal) 2001
Ramonda Serbika Award 2002 of Književna kolonija „Sićevo“
Stefan Mitrov Ljubiša Award 2002 for literary life achievement
Award of Udruženje Beogradjana “6. april 1941” for her complete literary work about Belgrade, 2007
Gordana Todorović Award for life work of women writers 2008

References

1933 births
2014 deaths
University of Belgrade Faculty of Philology alumni
Writers from Belgrade
Eastern Orthodox Christians from Serbia
Serbian non-fiction writers
Members of the Serbian Academy of Sciences and Arts
Serbian women novelists
20th-century Serbian novelists
20th-century Serbian women writers
Serbian women essayists
Serbian women journalists
Serbian children's writers
Serbian women children's writers
Serbian dramatists and playwrights
Serbian women short story writers
Serbian short story writers
21st-century Serbian women writers
Serbian book publishers (people)
Chevaliers of the Légion d'honneur
Yugoslav women writers
Yugoslav journalists
Yugoslav essayists
Burials at Belgrade New Cemetery